"Girlfriend/Boyfriend" is a song by American R&B group Blackstreet. It was released in May 1999 as the second and final single from their third album Finally. Janet Jackson is also featured in the song as well as rappers Ja Rule and Eve. The song is co-written by R&B singer and Ja Rule's former associate Cynthia "Lil' Mo" Loving. It was a minor hit in the United States and achieved moderate success in some other countries.

Background 
Janet Jackson and Teddy Riley previously collaborated on the remix of Jackson’s single "I Get Lonely" with Blackstreet in 1998. Later that year, MTV News reported Riley had worked with the Spice Girls on a new song, titled "Girlfriend, Boyfriend," for the soundtrack to the forthcoming film South Park: Bigger, Longer, Uncut. For reasons unreported, the Spice Girls' version of the song was never released, and the song was rerecorded with Janet Jackson, Ja Rule, and Eve for Blackstreet's own forthcoming album, Finally.

Jackson spoke favorably about the recording process, stating, "I really enjoyed working with [Teddy Riley]… It was a lot of fun in the studio. He reminds me of one of my brothers, and that's a good thing. That felt very good. So I'm sure we'll probably do something together in the future."

Critical reception 
Billboard reviewed the song positively, commenting, "This wispy slice of hip-hop funk sounds like the first no-holds-barred pop/R&B anthem for the spring season," and calling it "of-the-moment, hip, and deliciously sexy." In The Baltimore Sun, J. D. Considine praised Riley and Jackson’s chemistry, calling them "a pairing that adds extra heat to the tune's battle-of-the-sexes lyrics." The Washington Post noted the song's "choppy Timbaland-style beats."

Music video 
The accompanying music video for "Girlfriend/Boyfriend" was directed by Joseph Kahn. The music video had a budget of $1.5 million, causing VH1 to rank it 21st on its list of the 25 most expensive music videos ever made, published in 2013.

Track listing

Japan 5" CD Single
 Girlfriend/Boyfriend (House Mix) (6:34)
 Girlfriend/Boyfriend (House Mix Instrumental) (6:34)
 Girlfriend/Boyfriend (House Mix Acapella) (6:26)

U.S. 5" CD Single Remixes
 Girlfriend/Boyfriend (Grand Jury Carson Main Radio Remix) (4:13)
 Girlfriend/Boyfriend (Grand Jury Carson Rap Drop/Radio Fade) (4:12)
 Girlfriend/Boyfriend (The Anthem Remix) (4:12)
 Girlfriend/Boyfriend (Grand Jury Pasadena Remix) (4:38)

U.S. 12" Vinyl Maxi Single
 Girlfriend/Boyfriend (LP Version) (4:05)
 Girlfriend/Boyfriend (Radio Edit) (3:47)
 Girlfriend/Boyfriend (Instrumental) (4:05)
 Take Me There (Big Yam Remix) (3:19)
 Take Me There (LP Version) (5:01)
 Take Me There (Instrumental) (5:01)

Charts

Weekly charts

Year-end charts

Trivia
Despite being on the song and video together Eve and Janet Jackson never met until Eve revealed on The Talk (which Eve co-hosts) that she met Jackson for the first time at an after party early in her career where Jackson not only consoled her after someone spiked her drink but also (most likely) had her security team get the person in trouble for spiking Eve's drink.

References

1999 singles
Blackstreet songs
Eve (rapper) songs
Janet Jackson songs
Ja Rule songs
Music videos directed by Joseph Kahn
Song recordings produced by Teddy Riley
Songs written by Teddy Riley
1999 songs
Interscope Records singles
Songs written by Eve (rapper)
Songs written by Lil' Mo
Songs written by Jimmy Cozier